is a Japanese politician of the Liberal Democratic Party, a member of the House of Representatives in the Diet (national legislature). A native of Kitami, Hokkaido and graduate of Nagoya Institute of Technology, he was elected for the first time in 2005 after working as a secretary for Tsutomu Takebe, a member of the House of Representatives.

References

External links 
 Official website in Japanese.

1973 births
Living people
People from Kitami, Hokkaido
Members of the House of Representatives (Japan)
Liberal Democratic Party (Japan) politicians
21st-century Japanese politicians